Alread is an unincorporated community in Van Buren County, Arkansas, United States.

Education
The community is a part of the Clinton School District, which operates Clinton High School.

On July 1, 2004, the Alread district consolidated with the Scotland School District into the existing Clinton district.

References

Unincorporated communities in Van Buren County, Arkansas
Unincorporated communities in Arkansas